The Masked Rider is a 1916 silent film drama directed by Fred J. Balshofer and starring Harold Lockwood and May Allison. It was distributed by Metro Pictures.

Cast
May Allison - Jill Jamison
Lester Cuneo - Squid Archer
Harold Lockwood - Bruce Edmunds
Clarissa Selwynne - Mrs. Hart
Howard Truesdell - Jimmy Jamison
H. W. Willis - Grant Carr
Jack McDonald - Tom Monjar
Harry Burkhardt - Patrick Hart
Harry Linkey - George Edmunds

Preservation status
The film exists with prints at the George Eastman House, Library of Congress and New Zealand Film Archive.

References

External links
 The Masked Rider at IMDb.com

1916 films
American silent feature films
Metro Pictures films
American black-and-white films
Silent American drama films
1916 drama films
Films directed by Fred J. Balshofer
1910s American films